Bennedict Richard Felder Mathurin (born June 19, 2002) is a Canadian professional basketball player for the Indiana Pacers of the National Basketball Association (NBA). He played college basketball for the Arizona Wildcats, where he was named a consensus second-team All-American and Pac-12 Player of the Year after his sophomore season. He was selected by the Pacers with the sixth overall pick in the 2022 NBA draft.

Early life and career
Mathurin is a native of Montreal, Quebec, and grew up playing ice hockey and football as a quarterback. He competed for the Quebec provincial basketball team. In 2018, Mathurin joined the NBA Academy Latin America in Mexico City, becoming its first Canadian-born player. He committed to playing college basketball for Arizona, choosing the Wildcats over Baylor. He was considered the best Canadian prospect in his class by North Pole Hoops.

College career
On January 2, 2021, Mathurin posted 24 points and 11 rebounds in an 86–82 win over Washington State. On January 14, he recorded 31 points and eight rebounds in a 98–64 win over Oregon State. Mathurin averaged 10.8 points, 4.8 rebounds and 1.2 assists per game, shooting 41.8 percent from three-point range. Despite gaining interest as a draft prospect, he decided to return for his sophomore season. On December 11, 2021, Mathurin scored 30 points in a 83-79 win against Illinois. He was named Pac-12 Player of the Year. 

On April 14, 2022, Mathurin declared for the 2022 NBA draft, forgoing his remaining college eligibility.

Professional career

Indiana Pacers (2022–present) 
Mathurin was selected with the sixth overall pick by the Indiana Pacers in the 2022 NBA draft. He is the first ever player from Montreal to be selected as a lottery pick. He joined the seventh overall pick, Shaedon Sharpe, as the only Canadians drafted in the first round that year. Mathurin was the Pacers' highest pick the franchise has owned since selecting Rik Smits second overall in the 1988 NBA Draft. On July 3, 2022, Mathurin signed his rookie contract with the Pacers. On July 8, he made his NBA Summer League debut, recording 23 points and four rebounds in a 96–84 win over the Charlotte Hornets. Ten days later, Mathurin was named to the All-NBA Summer League Second Team, averaging 19.3 points, 4 rebounds and 1.3 steals per game. 

On October 19, Mathurin made his regular season debut coming off the bench, recording 19 points in a 114–107 loss to the Washington Wizards. He would follow that performance, by scoring 26 points against Jeremy Sochan and the San Antonio Spurs on October 21, and 27 points against Jaden Ivey and the Detroit Pistons on October 22.  His 72 points through the first three games of the season was the most by a rookie since Jerry Stackhouse scored 76 to start off the 1995–96 NBA season. On October 26, he became the first Pacer to score 100+ points through their first five career games. On October 29, Mathurin set a career-high with 32 points and five rebounds in a 125–116 win over the Brooklyn Nets. On December 1, Mathurin was named Eastern Conference Kia Rookie of the Month, averaging 19.2 points, 4 rebounds, on 40.3% three-point shooting. On January 31, 2023, Mathurin was named a 2023 NBA Rising Star alongside standout rookie teammate Andrew Nembhard. On February 13, after scoring 21 points against the Utah Jazz, Mathurin became the fastest Pacer rookie since Chuck Person (1986–87) to reach 1,000 career points.

National team career
Mathurin played for Canada at the 2021 FIBA Under-19 World Cup in Riga and Daugavpils, Latvia after being cut from the Olympic team. On July 4, 2021, he scored a team-high 30 points, shooting 11-of-15 from the field and 6-of-9 from three point range, in a 100–75 group stage win over Japan. One week later, Mathurin scored 31 points to lead Canada to a 101–92 victory over Serbia in the third-place game and win the bronze medal. He averaged 16.1 points and four rebounds per game in the tournament.

Career statistics

College

|-
| style="text-align:left;"| 2020–21
| style="text-align:left;"| Arizona
| 26 || 12 || 25.0 || .471 || .418 || .846 || 4.8 || 1.2 || .7 || .1 || 10.8
|-
| style="text-align:left;"| 2021–22
| style="text-align:left;"| Arizona
| 37 || 37 || 32.5 || .450 || .369 || .764 || 5.6 || 2.5 || 1.0 || .3 || 17.7
|- class="sortbottom"
| style="text-align:center;" colspan="2"| Career
| 63 || 49 || 29.4 || .456 || .383 || .789 || 5.3 || 2.0 || .9 || .2 || 14.8

Personal life
Mathurin is of Haitian descent. His older sister, Jennifer, played college basketball for NC State. When Mathurin was 12 years old, his 15-year-old brother died in a bicycle accident. He speaks English, French, Spanish, and Creole.

References

External links

Arizona Wildcats bio

2002 births
Living people
All-American college men's basketball players
Arizona Wildcats men's basketball players
Basketball players from Montreal
Canadian expatriate basketball people in the United States
National Basketball Association players from Canada
Canadian men's basketball players
Canadian sportspeople of Haitian descent
Indiana Pacers draft picks
Indiana Pacers players
Shooting guards
Small forwards